Kvaternik is a surname.  Notable people with the surname include:

Dido Kvaternik (1910–1962), also Eugen Dido Kvaternik, Croatian Ustaše General-Lieutenant, son of Slavko Kvaternik
Eugen Kvaternik (1825–1871), Croatian nationalist politician
Slavko Kvaternik (1878–1947), Croatian military commander, one of the founders of Ustaše, father of Dido Kvaternik and brother of Petar Milutin Kvaternik
Petar Milutin Kvaternik (1882–1941), Croatian politician, brother of Slavko Kvaternik